Aleksi Mäkelä may refer to:

 Aleksi Mäkelä (director)
 Aleksi Mäkelä (ice hockey, born 1993)
 Aleksi Mäkelä (ice hockey, born 1995)